A shell is a type of structural element which is characterized by its geometry, being a three-dimensional solid whose thickness is very small when compared with other dimensions, and in structural terms, by the stress resultants calculated in the middle plane displaying components which are both coplanar and normal to the surface.
Essentially, a shell can be derived from a plate by two means: by initially forming the middle surface as a singly or doubly curved surface, and by applying loads which are coplanar to a plate's plane which generate significant stresses.

Thin-shell structures (also called plate and shell structures) are lightweight constructions using shell elements. These elements, typically curved, are assembled to make large structures. Typical applications include aircraft fuselages, boat hulls, and the roofs of large buildings.

Definition
A thin shell is defined as a shell with a thickness which is small compared to its other dimensions and in which deformations are not large compared to thickness. A primary difference between a shell structure and a plate structure is that, in the unstressed state, the shell structure has curvature as opposed to the plates structure which is flat. Membrane action in a shell is primarily caused by in-plane forces (plane stress), but there may be secondary forces resulting from flexural deformations. Where a flat plate acts similar to a beam with bending and shear stresses, shells are analogous to a cable which resists loads through tensile stresses. The ideal thin shell must be capable of developing both tension and compression.

Types
The most popular types of thin-shell structures are:
 Concrete shell structures, often cast as a monolithic dome or stressed ribbon bridge or saddle roof
 Lattice shell structures, also called gridshell structures, often in the form of a geodesic dome or a hyperboloid structure
 Membrane structures, which include fabric structures and other tensile structures, cable domes, and pneumatic structures.

See also

 Monocoque
 Diagrid
 Stretched grid method
 List of thin shell structures
Persons related:
 Félix Candela
 Dyckerhoff & Widmann
 Wilhelm Flügge
 Eugène Freyssinet
 Heinz Isler
 Pier Luigi Nervi
 Plate
 Frei Otto
 Ernest Edwin Sechler
 Vladimir Shukhov
 All-Russia Exhibition 1896
 Eduardo Torroja
 Membrane theory of shells

References

Further reading

External links

 Thin-shell structures
 Double thin-shells structures
 Hypar & Concrete Shells
 Past and Future of Grid Shell Structures
 Shape optimization of Shell and Spatial structure
 Lattice Shell for Space Vehicles
 International Association for Shell and Spatial Structures

Solid mechanics
Structural system